Runanga is a small town on the West Coast of the South Island of New Zealand. It is located eight kilometres to the northeast of Greymouth, to the north of the Grey River. Barrytown is  further north.  and the Rapahoe Branch railway run through the town. Runanga was formerly a railway junction, with the steep Rewanui Branch diverging from the Rapahoe line until closure in 1985.

The town's origins can be traced back to European colonisation in the late 19th century, when large numbers of settlers came to work the local coal fields. The town's name is Māori for "meeting place". Coal mining is still the main employer of the town.

History
During the period 1853 to 1876, the area which became the township of Runanga was administrated as part of the Nelson Province.

Unlike many towns and settlements on the West Coast which grew up around gold mining, Runanga was established as a centre to support the local coal mining industry. In 1902 the Seddon Government established its own coal mines, proclaiming the whole area on the north side of the Grey River as a State Coal Reserve. The Point Elizabeth No. 1 mine began producing coal from 17 March 1904. In 1903 a sawmill opened and timber houses began to replace the tents which had formed housing until then. The Borough of Runanga came into effect in 1912 with an area of 1,210 acres and a population of about 1,500.

Demographics

The statistical area of Runanga, which includes Dunollie and Rapahoe, had a population of 1,185 at the 2018 New Zealand census, a decrease of 63 people (-5.0%) since the 2013 census, and a decrease of 48 people (-3.9%) since the 2006 census. There were 519 households. There were 621 males and 567 females, giving a sex ratio of 1.1 males per female. The median age was 45.2 years (compared with 37.4 years nationally), with 201 people (17.0%) aged under 15 years, 204 (17.2%) aged 15 to 29, 564 (47.6%) aged 30 to 64, and 213 (18.0%) aged 65 or older.

Ethnicities were 92.9% European/Pākehā, 11.9% Māori, 0.8% Pacific peoples, 1.8% Asian, and 1.3% other ethnicities (totals add to more than 100% since people could identify with multiple ethnicities).

The proportion of people born overseas was 6.3%, compared with 27.1% nationally.

Although some people objected to giving their religion, 59.5% had no religion, 26.3% were Christian, 0.3% were Muslim, 0.3% were Buddhist and 2.8% had other religions.

Of those at least 15 years old, 45 (4.6%) people had a bachelor or higher degree, and 342 (34.8%) people had no formal qualifications. The median income was $24,400, compared with $31,800 nationally. The employment status of those at least 15 was that 423 (43.0%) people were employed full-time, 162 (16.5%) were part-time, and 54 (5.5%) were unemployed.

Community

As with most other towns, Runanga had its fair share of clubs and societies. One such organisation that no longer exists in Runanga, and which few may remember, is the Runanga Lodge No 74 of the Royal Antedilluvian Order of Buffaloe's. This Lodge was opened on May 13, 1939, by the Provincial Grand Primo Bro. James Insull K.O.M. The founders of the lodge were Bro. C Ingram C.P. and Bro. T Durkin C.P.

The Foundation members were R McMillan,  H Fisher, J Musgrove, J O'Connel, W.T. Foster, F Crange, R McTaggart, Owen O'Connell, G.W. Timlin, A.W. Fisher, W Amor, J Stephens, D Butler, S H Werner, J O'Neil and R Scott.

In April 1943, The Lodge held their first meeting in their own Hall. They had been meeting in rented accommodation up until then.

Miners' Hall 

The Runanga Miners' Hall is registered by Heritage New Zealand as a Category I structure, with registration number 9613. It is significant because of its place in the history of the union movement in New Zealand and because it is one of the few remaining examples of a miners' hall. A $1.1 million project to strengthen the Miner's Hall was announced in 2020.

Coal Creek Waterfall 

The Coal Creek waterfall is accessed via the Coal Creek walking track which starts in Runanga. The track is a gentle 3.6 kilometres return and travels along Coal Creek through beech trees and other podocarps. The waterfalls are the width of the river and seven metres high.

Notable people
Moses Ayrton, New Zealand politician
 George Duggan (1912–2012) was a New Zealand Marist priest, philosopher, seminary professor and writer (he was popularly known as Chalky Duggan – after a featherweight boxer who fought in 1919, when Duggan was 7 years old, under the name "Chalky Duggan" and who, like Duggan, came from Runanga.
 Dave McKenzie (born 1943 in Dunollie, Grey District) is a former long-distance runner. He represented New Zealand in the men's marathon at two consecutive Summer Olympics, starting in Mexico City (1968). He won the Boston Marathon in 1967.
 George Menzies, who in 2008 was named the greatest rugby league five-eighth New Zealand had ever produced spent his playing career at Runanga's club.
 James O'Brien, Labour MP for Westland 1922–25 and 1928–1947 and Minister of Transport and Marine during the First Labour Government, lived and worked in Runanga from 1906 for about ten years.
 Bob Semple, Minister of Public Works in the First Labour Government, was President of the Runanga Miner's Union in 1907.
 Paddy Webb, Minister of Mines in the First Labour Government, worked in the Runanga mine about 1906.

Education
Runanga School is a coeducational full primary school (years 1–8), with a roll of  students as of

Notes

External links
 Runanga School website

Grey District
Populated places in the West Coast, New Zealand